The 2013 Copa Sevilla was a professional tennis tournament played on clay courts. It was the 16th edition of the tournament which was part of the 2013 ATP Challenger Tour. It took place in Seville, Spain between 9 and 15 September 2013.

Singles main draw entrants

Seeds

 1 Rankings are as of August 26, 2013.

Other entrants
The following players received wildcards into the singles main draw:
  Agustín Boje-Ordóñez
  Sergio Gutiérrez Ferrol
  Ricardo Ojeda Lara
  Roberto Ortega-Olmedo

The following player received entry as an alternate into the singles main draw:
  Carlos Gómez-Herrera

The following players used a protected ranking to receive entry into the singles main draw:
  Óscar Hernández

The following players received entry from the qualifying draw:
  David Pérez Sanz
  Enrico Burzi
  Michal Schmid
  Miliaan Niesten

Champions

Singles

 Daniel Gimeno Traver def.  Stéphane Robert 6–4, 7–6(7–2)

Doubles

 Alessandro Motti /  Stéphane Robert def.  Stephan Fransen /  Wesley Koolhof 7–5, 7–5

External links
Official Website

 
2013
2013 ATP Challenger Tour
2013 in Spanish tennis
September 2013 sports events in Europe